World Space Week (WSW) is an annual holiday observed from October 4 to 10 in over 95 nations throughout the world.  World Space Week is officially defined as "an international celebration of science and technology, and their contribution to the betterment of the human condition". World Space week is organized every year by coordination of the World Space Week Association (WSWA) and the United Nations (UN).

History
On December 6, 1999, The United Nations General Assembly declared World Space Week as an annual event celebration to be commemorated between October 4 and 10. The choice of dates was based on recognition of two important dates in space history: the launch of the first human-made Earth satellite, Sputnik 1, on October 4, 1957; and the signing of the Outer Space Treaty on October 10, 1967.

World Space Week is the largest annual space event in the world.  In 2019, World Space Week was celebrated with over 8,000 events in 96 countries.  Events included school activities, exhibitions, government events, and special activities at planetaria around the world.

Annual themes
Each year, a theme for World Space Week is established by the Board of Directors of World Space Week Association. Under the theme "The Moon:  Gateway to the Stars", many events of World Space Week 2019 focused on the 50th anniversary of the Apollo 11 landing, plans for human exploration of the Moon, and Lunar observation by telescope.

In 2022, theme of World Space Week is "Space and Sustainability.". In 2021, "Women in Space" was the theme. In 2020, the theme for World Space Week was "Satellites Improve Life", and  SES CEO Steve Collar was World Space Week 2020 Honorary Chair.

Activities and observances
The World Space Week Association is a non-governmental, non-profit organization, which is supported by national coordinators in over 50 nations. It is led by an all-volunteer Board of Directors including Buzz Aldrin, Bill Nye the Science Guy, Tom Hanks, Dumitru Prunariu, and space leaders from around the world. Its goals are to educate people around the world about the benefits that they receive from space, encourage use of space for sustainable economic development, foster enthusiastic education and interest in science and cooperation between nations through space outreach and education.

The association provides resources for educators in grade K-12.

A Calendar of Events from nations celebrating World Space Week is available.

SPACE India is the only Regional Coordinator of World Space Week In India.

See also
International Day of Human Space Flight

References

External links
 World Space Week The United Nations
 World Space Week website

Awareness weeks
October observances
Space advocacy
Space Week, World